K2 Telecom is a telecommunications network company in Uganda. It was established in January 2013. By November 2015, the company's estimated its number of subscribers at about 200,000.

History
K2 was launched by Kabaka Ronald Muwenda Mutebi II, on 31 December 2012. The telco needed one million subscribers to break even. However, K2 could not build up the numbers required to stay afloat.

In May 2018, with the phone company owing the Uganda Revenue Authority (URA) USh96 million (US$26,000) in unpaid taxes, URA closed K2 Telecom down. The taxes had accumulated since 2013.

Airtel Uganda took over the 100,000 customers that K2 had left in July 2018. K2 Telecom continued to operate as a "virtual telecom", receiving a royalty on services rendered to its customers. This partnership is expected to continue, at least until calendar year 2019.

See also
List of mobile network operators in Uganda

References

External links
Official website

Telecommunications companies of Uganda
Telecommunications companies established in 2013
Mobile phone companies of Uganda
Companies based in Kampala